Ihor Anatoliyovych Razoronov (born March 25, 1970) is a Ukrainian weightlifter. He appeared at the 2008 Summer Olympics in Beijing but was disqualified after testing positive for nandrolone.

References

 

1970 births
Living people
Ukrainian male weightlifters
Olympic weightlifters of Ukraine
Weightlifters at the 1996 Summer Olympics
Weightlifters at the 2000 Summer Olympics
Weightlifters at the 2004 Summer Olympics
Weightlifters at the 2008 Summer Olympics
Doping cases in weightlifting
Olympic silver medalists for Ukraine
Ukrainian sportspeople in doping cases
Olympic medalists in weightlifting
Medalists at the 2004 Summer Olympics
People from Lyman, Ukraine
European Weightlifting Championships medalists
World Weightlifting Championships medalists
Sportspeople from Donetsk Oblast
20th-century Ukrainian people
21st-century Ukrainian people